Alexander MacBeth Sutherland (December 31, 1849 – March 7, 1884) was a lawyer and political figure in Manitoba. He represented Kildonan from 1879 to 1884 in the Legislative Assembly of Manitoba as a Liberal-Conservative.

He was born in Point Douglas, Manitoba, the son of John Sutherland and Janet MacBeth, and was educated in Kildonan, at St. John's College, at Manitoba College and at the University of Toronto. Sutherland served in the provincial cabinet as Attorney General and as Provincial Secretary.

He died of typhoid fever at the age of 35.

References

1849 births
1884 deaths
Progressive Conservative Party of Manitoba MLAs
Deaths from typhoid fever